Twisted Wheel are an indie rock band from Saddleworth, Greater Manchester, England.

Career

Formation and debut album
Twisted Wheel formed in February 2007 in Saddleworth, Greater Manchester by guitarist and singer Jonny Brown and bassist Rick Lees, later joined by drummer Adam Clarke. Frontman Jonny Brown heard the name in a Paul Weller track "Into Tomorrow", where the lyrics say "Round and round like a twisted wheel, Spinning in attempt to find the feel". Twisted Wheel were booked as one of the support acts for Oasis's 2009 Heaton Park concerts.

The band signed to Columbia Records in January 2008. Their first single, "She's a Weapon", was released in April 2008 to acclaim from Radio 1's Zane Lowe, NME and Q. Their follow-up record, a four-track EP entitled You Stole the Sun, was released in July 2008. The band's debut album Twisted Wheel was recorded in June 2008 at Hillside studios in Los Angeles and produced by Dave Sardy.

The album was released on 13 April 2009. The first single from the album, "Lucy the Castle", was released in November 2008, with the follow-up, "We Are Us", released in March 2009.

Do It Again (2012)
The band drifted from the mainstream attention after 2009 as their style of music declined in popularity. Twisted Wheel released their second album, Do It Again, in September 2012.

Break-up and reformation
The band broke up on 13 July 2014, which was announced to fans via the band's Twitter account, with the tweet simply stating "R.I.P. Twisted Wheel". They have since reformed.

In 2018 the band announced a 30 date comeback UK tour, with original drummer Adam Clarke rejoining the fold, alongside new members Harry Lavin and Richard Allsopp. During this tour the band were personally invited by Liam Gallagher to join the bill at two huge outdoor shows at Old Trafford Cricket Ground and Finsbury Park. On the day of The Finbusry Park gig the band reached number one in the UK physical charts with the 'Jonny Guitar' EP. In September of that year Clarke and Allsopp both left the band, with new members Ben Robinson and Ben Warwick joining in their place.

In March 2020 the band released their 3rd studio album 'Satisfying The Ritual' to critical acclaim, subsequently entering number 27 in the UK Official sales chart. Just prior to the release of this record, the band once again linked up with Liam Gallagher on a full European tour, before being stopped in their tracks by the covid crisis on the eve of a Uk headline tour.

Band members

Current members
 Jonny Brown – vocals, guitar
 Harry Lavin – bass
 Ben Warwick – guitar
 Ben Robinson – drums

Former members
 Adam Clarke – drums (2007–2010)
 Rick Lees – bass (2007–2010)
 Eoghan Clifford – drums (2010–2013)
 Stephen Evans – bass (2010–2013)
 Max Lees – bass (2013–2014)
 Blair Murray – drums (2013–2014)
 Adam Birchall – guitar (2013–2014)

Discography

 Twisted Wheel (2009)
 Do It Again (2012)
 Satisfying the Ritual (2020)

References

External links
 
 MySpace site
 Twisted Wheel Facebook

English indie rock groups
Columbia Records artists
Musical groups from the Metropolitan Borough of Oldham
Musical groups disestablished in 2014
Musical groups established in 2007
Musical quartets
Ignition Records artists